Percy Holroyd was an English professional rugby league footballer who played in the 1900s. Percy Holroyd was possibly the first player local to Huddersfield be awarded some sort of benefit, his début was against Broughton Rangers on Saturday 8 November 1902, and nine seasons later, for his service to Huddersfield, he was presented with the sum of £50 (based on increases in average earnings, this would be approximately £18,850 in 2017).

Playing career

International honours
Percy Holroyd won a cap for England while at Huddersfield in 1909 against Wales.

County Cup Final appearances
Percy Holroyd played , and scored 2-goals in Huddersfield's 21–0 victory over Batley in the 1909 Yorkshire County Cup Final during the 1909–10 season at Headingley Rugby Stadium, Leeds on Saturday 27 November 1909.

References

England national rugby league team players
English rugby league players
Huddersfield Giants players
Place of birth missing
Place of death missing
Rugby league five-eighths
Rugby league players from Huddersfield
Year of birth missing
Year of death missing